The Four Dharmadhatu, is a philosophical concept propagated by Master Dushun (Chinese: 杜順; 557-640 CE), the founder of the Huayan school. It builds upon and is a variant of the Dharmadhatu doctrine.

The Four Dharmadhatu
The Four Dharmadhatu were outlined in Dushun's treatise, the title of which has been rendered into English as 'On the Meditation of Dharmadhātu'. The Four Dharmadhatu are:

The Dharmadhātu of Shi. Shi holds the semantic field "matter", "phenomenon", "event". It may be understood as the "realm" (Sanskrit: dhātu) of all matters and phenomena. 
The Dharmadhātu of Li. Li holds the semantic field:  "principle", "law", "noumenon". This realm may be understood as that of principles. It has been referred to as "the realm of the one principle". The "one principle" being qualified as śūnyatā (Sanskrit). 
The Dharmadhātu of Non-obstruction of Li against Shi. This realm has been rendered into English as "the realm of non-obstruction between principle and phenomena". 
The Dharmadhātu of the Non-obstruction of Shi and Shi. This realm has been rendered into English as "the realm of non-obstruction between phenomena".

See also
 Two truths doctrine
 Five wisdoms
 Four ways of knowing
 Yogacara
 Eight Consciousnesses
 Huayan school

References

Further reading
 Oh, Kang-nam (2000). The Taoist Influence on Hua-yen Buddhism: A Case of the Sinicization of Buddhism in China. Chung-Hwa Buddhist Journal, No. 13, (2000). Source:  (accessed: January 28, 2008)

External links
 Taigen Dan Leighton, Huayan Buddhism and the Phenomenal Universe of the Flower Ornament Sutra

Buddhist philosophical concepts